John Robinson (1654-1734) was born in Huntington, New York. He served as a representative of Queens County in the 1691 New York Colonial Assembly to replace John Tredwell after he was arrested on a "scandalous" charge. He is the father of Captain Robert Robinson, one of the founders of Yaphank. John Robinson died in Oyster Bay, New York in 1734.

References

1654 births
1734 deaths
People from Huntington, New York
People of the Province of New York